George VIII (Georgian: გიორგი VIII, Giorgi VIII; 1417–1476) was the last king of the united Georgia, though his kingdom was already splintered and embroiled in a civil war, from 1446 to 1465. Defeated by his rivals, he was left with an eastern province Kakheti alone, where he reigned as George I from 1465 until his death, founding a local branch of the Bagrationi royal house.

Life
He was the third son of Alexander I of Georgia by his second wife Tamar. Though Demetre, Alexander’s second son, seems to have been a rightful successor to his elder brother Vakhtang IV, George actually held power after Vakhtang’s death in December 1446. The process of the disintegration of the Georgian kingdom had already begun and was close to reach its climax. The most troublesome were revolts by the western Georgian nobles and the atabegs of Samtskhe. The latter even attempted to create a separate church for his princedom, but the efforts of the Georgian Catholicos Patriarch David IV prevented the Georgian Orthodox Church from being split into two.

George’s reign coincided with a major turning point in Near East history: in 1453 the Ottoman Turks conquered Constantinople and put an end to the Byzantine Empire, with the emperor Constantine XI, to whom George’s daughter was betrothed, dying in battle. The Georgian politicians, preoccupied in their own power struggle, seem to have underestimated the event which would leave Georgia isolated from Christian Europe for almost the three subsequent centuries. Yet, Georgia was considered as a possible participant of a large anti-Ottoman crusade planned by the Pope Pius II and Western European powers. For this purpose, Ludovico da Bologna was sent to hold talks in Georgia and George VIII agreed a truce with his internal opponents. Georgians hoped to mobilise in total 120,000 soldiers to fight sultan Mehmed the Conqueror and proposed even to continue the Crusade on Jerusalem. The coalition was never formed, however, and the fratricidal struggles within Georgia were soon resumed.

In 1462, George took Samokalako (Kutaisi and the surrounding area) from its owner, a royal kinsman, Bagrat for his support to the rebel prince Qvarqvare II Jaqeli, a powerful atabeg of Samtskhe. In 1463, Bagrat allied himself with other oppositionist royal subjects, dukes (eristavi) of Mingrelia, Guria, Svaneti and Abkhazia. The rebels met and defeated the king at the Battle of Chikhori. Subsequently, the king lost all western provinces and Bagrat was crowned king of Imereti. In 1465, George attempted to subdue Qvarqvare II of Samtskhe, only to be attacked and taken prisoner at Lake Paravani. The situation was immediately exploited by Bagrat of Imereti, who seized control of Tbilisi and declared himself king of Georgia. Atabeg Qvarqvare, who now considered Bagrat as his major rival, freed George. The latter, unsuccessful in his attempt to recover his crown, was only able to establish himself as a separate king in the easternmost province of Kakheti. There, he substantially reorganised the administration, subdividing the kingdom into much smaller and easily controllable samouravo (counties) instead of autonomous saeristavo (duchies). Unlike to other Georgian polities, he put ecclesiastic lords (bishops of Bodbe, Alaverdi, Rustavi, and Nekresi), generally more loyal to the crown than secular nobles, in charge of special military districts, sadrosho.

He died in 1476 to be succeeded by Alexander I as king of Kakheti.

Marriage and children
George VIII's royal charters make mention of two names of his consort, Tamar (fl. 1453) and Nestan-Darejan (fl. 1458–1463). Two explanations exist to account for this. One of them, suggested by Cyril Toumanoff, has it that both names were borne by the same woman, a daughter of Bagrat, son of Constantine I of Georgia, and, thus a first cousin of George VIII, whom she married in 1445. Such polyonymy was not infrequent in Georgia, Toumanoff explains, reflecting the twofold cultural background of the country, "Hellenistic-Christian on the one hand, and Caucasio-Iranoid, on the other." She is last mentioned in 1510. 

An alternative view, enjoying a more general currency in Georgia, holds it that George VIII was married twice, first to Tamar, sometimes thought to have been daughter of Kvarkvare II Jaqeli, Atabag of Samtskhe, whom he wed c. 1445 and, secondly to Nestan-Darejan, of unknown origin, whom the king took as his wife sometime before 1456. According to this version, Alexander had a son, Vakhtang, and two daughters; and a son, Aleksandre, and a daughter, Mariam, by Nestan-Darejan.

George VIII's children were:

 Prince Vakhtang (c. 1445 – before 1510), a "provincial king", he was married to the certain Gulkan;
 Princess Elene, married to Spiridon Beenashvili, a nobleman from Meskheti;
 Princess Keteon (Kristine), married to Vakhushti Shalikahsvili, a nobleman from Samtskhe;
 Prince Aleksandre (1445 or c. 1456 – 1511), King of Kakheti (1476–1511);
 Princess Mariam (fl. 1465), married to Prince Giorgi Shaburidze, son of Vamek, Duke of Argavi. She is identified by C. Toumanoff with the anonymous daughter of George VIII betrothed in 1451 to Constantine XI, the last Byzantine emperor, who was killed in the fall of Constantinople two years later, before the marriage could be consummated.

In historical fiction

 Emanuele Rizzardi, L'ultimo Paleologo. PubMe Editore, 2017

Ancestors

References

Further reading

Ronald Grigor Suny, The Making of the Georgian Nation: 2nd edition (December 1994), Indiana University Press, page 45-46

Kings of Georgia
Kings of Kakheti
Bagrationi dynasty of the Kingdom of Georgia
1417 births
1476 deaths
Burials at Svetitskhoveli Cathedral
Eastern Orthodox monarchs